Wellness tourism is travel for the purpose of promoting health and well-being through physical, psychological, or spiritual activities.

Market
Within the US $3.4 trillion spa and wellness economy, wellness tourism is estimated to total US$494 billion or 14.6 percent of all 2013 domestic and international tourism expenditures. Driven by growth in Asia, the Middle East/North Africa, Sub-Saharan Africa and developing countries, wellness tourism is expected to grow 50 percent faster than the overall tourism industry over the next five years. Market is expected to grow through 2014.

Wellness tourists are generally high-yield tourists, spending, on average, 130 percent more than the average tourist. In 2013, International wellness tourists spend approximately 59 percent more per trip than the average international tourist; domestic wellness tourists spend about 159 percent more than the average domestic tourist. Domestic wellness tourism is significantly larger than its international equivalent, representing 84 percent of wellness travel and 68 percent of expenditures (or $299 billion). International wellness tourism represents 16 percent of wellness travel and 32 percent of expenditures ($139 billion market).

The wellness tourism market includes primary and secondary wellness tourists. Primary wellness tourists travel entirely for wellness purposes while secondary wellness tourists engage in wellness-related activities as part of a trip. Secondary wellness tourists constitute the significant majority (87 percent) of total wellness tourism trips and expenditures (85 percent).

Types
Wellness travelers pursue diverse services, including physical fitness and sports; beauty treatments; healthy diet and weight management; relaxation and stress relief; spiritual tourism, including meditation and yoga, whether classical or as exercise; and health-related education. Wellness travelers may seek procedures or treatments using conventional, alternative, complementary, herbal, or homeopathic medicine.

Wellness resorts and retreats offer short-term, residential programs to address specific health concerns, reduce stress, or support lifestyle improvement.

Individual teachers, trainers or wellness practitioners may privately rent resort centers, small hotels or sections of larger hotels themed for the purpose.

Industry leaders meet for weekends in destination locations to discuss and promote their businesses.

Cruise ships can offer wellness programs including the use of on-board spas.

Destinations
Wellness tourism is now an identifiable niche market in at least 30 countries. Twenty countries accounted for 85 percent of global wellness tourism expenditures in 2012. The top five countries alone (United States, Germany, Japan, France, Austria) account for more than half the market (59 percent of expenditures).

North America
As of 2014, the US is the largest wellness tourism market, with $180.7 billion in annual, combined international and domestic expenditures. The US is the top destination for inbound international wellness tourism, with 7.1 million international, inbound trips. Europe and high-income Asian countries are primary sources of wellness tourists traveling to the US.

Domestic tourism accounts for the majority (94 percent) of wellness trips in North America. Americans and Canadians receive—and take—few vacation days compared to workers in other countries making domestic, weekend trips the most popular wellness travel option.

Europe
Europe is the second largest wellness tourism market, with $158.4 billion in annual, combined international and domestic expenditures; the region ranks highest in number of wellness trips with 216.2 million, compared to North America's 171.7 in 2013. Europeans have long believed in health benefits derived from mineral baths, saunas, thalassotherapy, and other natural and water-based treatments. Thermal resorts and hotels in Turkey and Hungary cater to wellness tourists, many of whom are subsidized by host countries such as Norway and Denmark seeking to mitigate costs of medical procedures for patients with chronic conditions requiring expensive surgeries.

Asia-Pacific
The Asia-Pacific region ranks as the third largest with $6.4 billion in annual, combined international and domestic expenditures. Ancient regional wellness traditions include Indian Ayurveda, Yoga, traditional Chinese medicine, Hilot, and Thai massage.

Latin America-Caribbean
Latin America-Caribbean is the fourth largest region for wellness tourism in terms of number of trips and expenditures. Domestic tourism accounts for about 71 percent of wellness tourism trips, and 54 percent of wellness tourism expenditures.

Middle East and Africa
The Middle East and Africa are currently the smallest regions for wellness tourism. The Middle East has a long tradition of bathing associated with Turkish baths, and some older facilities are being modernized to serve spa-bound tourists. Tourism is on the rise in the region, and governments and private developers are developing new facilities.

In Africa, wellness tourism is concentrated in a few regions such as South Africa and the Maghreb; it is dominated by international tourists.

Criticism
Wellness tourism advocates suggest that vacations improve physical well-being, happiness, and productivity, citing that health-oriented trips give travelers a fresh perspective and positively affect creativity, resilience, problem solving, and capacity for coping with stress. Yet the health benefits of wellness vacations expected and reported by vacationers have proved difficult to quantify.

See also

 Travel
 Tourism
 Medical tourism
 Wellness
 Yoga tourism
 Naftalan, Azerbaijan
 Bilgah

References

External links

Types of tourism